Lord Maxwell’s Last Goodnight is Child ballad 195. It is based on the actions of John Maxwell, 9th Lord Maxwell, who killed Sir James Johnstone in 1608 as the culmination of a family feud. He fled to France and was sentenced to death in his absence, returning in secret five years later. He was apprehended and beheaded at Edinburgh on 21 May 1613.

Synopsis

Lady Maxwell asks her husband to come with her into her father's garden.  He tells her that he killed the laird Johnstone, who killed his father, and must flee.  He bids a tender farewell to her, the rest of his family, and Scotland, and is escorted off to his ship by a great company.

References

Further reading
Kinsley, James, ed. (1969) The Oxford Book of Ballads. Oxford: Clarendon Press; pp. 607–10. With an air from the Blaikie MS., p. 19, no. 55 (entitled "The King of Faeries"); text is Child 195A, from George Paton's MS., 1778.

External links

Lord Maxwell’s Last Goodnight
Historical information
 Lord Maxwell's Last Goodnight. In: The English and Scottish Popular Ballads. Edited by Francis James Child. Part VII. Houghton, Mifflin and Company, Boston 1890, p. 34  Archive.org

Child Ballads
Scottish folklore